David McDonald (May 8, 1803 – August 25, 1869) was a United States district judge of the United States District Court for the District of Indiana.

Education and career

Born in Millersburg, Kentucky, McDonald read law to enter the bar in 1830, and entered private practice in Washington, Indiana. He was a member of the Indiana House of Representatives from 1833 to 1834, and a prosecuting attorney of the 7th Judicial Circuit of Indiana from 1834 to 1837, thereafter returning to private practice until 1839. He was a Judge of the 10th Judicial Circuit of Indiana from 1839 to 1852, also serving as a Professor of law at Indiana University Bloomington from 1842 to 1852. He was again in private practice, this time in Indianapolis, Indiana from 1853 to 1864.

Federal judicial service

On December 12, 1864, McDonald was nominated by President Abraham Lincoln to a seat on the United States District Court for the District of Indiana vacated by Judge Albert Smith White. McDonald was confirmed by the United States Senate on December 13, 1864, and received his commission the same day, serving thereafter until his death on August 25, 1869, in Indianapolis.

References

Sources
 

1803 births
1869 deaths
Indiana state court judges
Members of the Indiana House of Representatives
Judges of the United States District Court for the District of Indiana
United States federal judges appointed by Abraham Lincoln
19th-century American judges
People from Millersburg, Kentucky
People from Washington, Indiana
People from Indianapolis
United States federal judges admitted to the practice of law by reading law
19th-century American politicians